The Springfield/Ozark Mountain Ducks were a minor league team that previously played in Ozark, Missouri, a suburb of Springfield. The team was a member of the Texas-Louisiana League, later named the Central Baseball League from 1998 to 2003. The team played in Price Cutter Park.

After 2003, they joined the Frontier League for one year in 2004 and disbanded after that when the Springfield Cardinals came to town. The Mountain Ducks folded after the 2004 season, with the rights to the club's spot in the CBL being sold to the Pensacola Pelicans of the discontinued Southeastern League.

Defunct minor league baseball teams
Sports clubs disestablished in 2004
Defunct independent baseball league teams
Defunct baseball teams in Missouri
Baseball teams established in 1998